The United States House Committee on the Budget, commonly known as the House Budget Committee, is a standing committee of the United States House of Representatives. Its responsibilities include legislative oversight of the federal budget process, reviewing all bills and resolutions on the budget, and monitoring agencies and programs funded outside of the budgetary process. The committee briefly operated as a select committee in 1919 and 1921, during the 66th and 67th United States Congresses, before being made a standing committee in 1974.

Role of the committee

The primary responsibility of the Budget Committee is the drafting and preparation of the Concurrent Resolution on the Budget, commonly referred to as the "budget resolution". This resolution sets the aggregate levels of revenue and spending that is expected to occur in a given fiscal year. A budget resolution by law must be enacted by Congress by April 15. This target date is rarely met, and in at least four years (FY1999, FY2003, FY2005, and FY2007) no budget resolution was ultimately adopted. This resolution also gives to each committee of the House an "allocation" of "new budget authority". This allocation is important in the consideration of legislation on the floor of the House. If a bill comes to the floor to be considered and it causes an increase in spending above this allocation, it is subject to a point of order (under 302(f) of the Congressional Budget Act). This is true for discretionary spending (spending that is provided to the Federal Government each year) and mandatory spending (spending such as entitlements where a beneficiary class is defined and a benefit is provided). If an entitlement is expanded and it has not been budgeted for in the budget resolution, it is subject to a point of order on the floor and, if not waived, will prevent it from being called up for consideration (if a Member of Congress stands before the body and makes the point of order).

In general, legislation is cleared of such problems prior to consideration through discussions between the House Parliamentarian, the House Leadership, and the House Budget Committee.

The committee holds hearings on federal budget legislation and congressional resolutions related to the federal budget process. The committee holds hearings on the president's annual budget request to Congress and drafts the annual Congressional Budget Resolution, which sets overall spending guidelines for Congress as it develops the annual federal appropriations bills. The committee also reviews supplemental budget requests submitted by the president, which cover items which for one reason or another were not included in the original budget request, usually for emergency spending. Recently, emergency budget supplementals have been used to request funding for the wars in Iraq and Afghanistan as well as for disaster recovery after Hurricanes Katrina and Rita. The committee may amend, approve, or table budget-related bills. It also has the power to enforce established federal budget rules, hold budget-related investigations, and subpoena witnesses. Additionally, the committee has oversight of the Congressional Budget Office.

Rules of the committee

The committee meets on the second Wednesday of each month while the House is in session. Though this is required, it is almost always waived and the committee only meets when a subject of sufficient importance arises. This usually occurs during the early part of the calendar year when the president's budget is issued and important budgetary decisions must be made.

It is not permitted to conduct business unless a quorum is present. For hearings, two members must be present for a hearing to begin. For a business meeting, such as a "mark-up" of a legislative document, a majority of its members must be present. If a bill is passed out of committee without the requisite quorum, it may be subject to a point of order on the floor of the U.S. House of Representatives.

The committee may only consider measures placed before it either by the chairman or by a majority vote of its members.

Each member of the committee may question witnesses during hearings, in order of seniority when the hearing is called to order. Otherwise, members are recognized in order of their arrival after the gavel has brought the committee to order.

Committee members
The committee is chaired by Republican Jodey Arrington from Texas. The ranking member is Democrat Brendan Boyle from Pennsylvania.

Also under House rules, unlike other committees of the House of Representatives, membership on the Budget Committee is term limited. Rank-and-file members must rotate off the committee after serving for three terms. Chairmen and ranking members may serve no more than four terms. (See Clause 5 of Rule X of the Rules of the House of Representatives). These limits are often waived, as they have been for Chairman John Kasich (R-OH), Chairman Jim Nussle (R-IA) and Chairman John Spratt (D-SC). Such a waiver requires a vote of the whole House, and is usually included in the opening day "Rules Package" that sets the rules for each successive Congress. Such a resolution is normally introduced as "House Resolution 5" or "House Resolution 6".

Several high-profile budget committee members have gone on to serve as Director of the Office of Management and Budget: Leon Panetta (budget committee chairman 1989–1993), Rob Portman (budget committee vice chairman) and Jim Nussle (budget committee chairman 2001–2007). Additionally, John Kasich (chairman 1995–2001) went on to serve as Governor of Ohio from 2011 to 2019, while Paul Ryan (chairman 2011–2015) was the Republican nominee for vice president in 2012 and the House speaker from 2015 to 2019.

Members, 118th Congress

Resolutions electing members:  (Chair),  (Ranking Member),  (D),  (R),  (D),  (amending rank)

Historical membership rosters

117th Congress

Resolutions electing members:  (Chair),  (Ranking Member),  (D),  (R),  (removing Marjorie Taylor Greene),  (R),  (R),  (R),  (R),  (R),  (R)

116th Congress

Sources:  (Chair),  (Ranking Member),  (D),  (R),  (D),  (R),  (D),  (R)

115th Congress

Sources:  (Chair),  (Ranking Member),  (R),  (D),  (R)

Major legislation reported out of the committee
 U.S. House Fiscal Year 2014 Budget (H. Con. Res. 25; 113th Congress) - was reported out of the Budget Committee on March 15, 2013, and introduced by Committee Chairman Paul Ryan to the House floor. It passed the House on March 21, 2013, 221–207.

See also
 List of current United States House of Representatives committees

References

External links

 House Budget Committee homepage (Archive)
 House Budget Committee. Legislation activity and reports, Congress.gov.

Budget
Economy of the United States
1974 establishments in Washington, D.C.
Organizations established in 1974